

Season summary
Despite winning the title to stop Rangers bid for 10 league championships in a row, as well as winning the Scottish League Cup, manager Wim Jansen resigned at the end of the season, to be replaced by Jozef Vengloš.

First-team squad
Squad at end of season

Kit numbers in UEFA Cup
 1: Gordon Marshall, Stewart Kerr
 2: Tom Boyd
 3: Tosh McKinlay, Stéphane Mahé
 4: Jackie McNamara
 5: Malky Mackay
 6: Alan Stubbs
 7: Henrik Larsson
 8: Darren Jackson, Craig Burley
 10: Andreas Thom
 11: Tommy Johnson, Darren Jackson, Regi Blinker
 12: Enrico Annoni, Simon Donnelly
 13: Gordon Marshall, Jonathan Gould
 14: Enrico Annoni, Simon Donnelly
 15: Phil O'Donnell, Stéphane Mahé
 16: David Hannah
 17: Morten Wieghorst, David Hannah
 18: Chris Hay, Tosh McKinlay, Brian McLaughlin
 19: Stuart Gray, Enrico Annoni
 20: Stuart Gray, Phil O'Donnell
 21: Graeme Morrison, Peter Grant
 23: Andy McCondichie, Jonathan Gould
 25: Barry Elliot
 28: John Paul McBride

Reserve squad
The following players played for Celtic's reserve team during the season, but were not called up for the first team.

Competitions

Scottish Premier Division

League table

Matches

Scottish Cup

Scottish League Cup

UEFA Cup

Transfers

Transfers In
 Darren Jackson - Hibernian - £1,250,000 - July 1997
 Craig Burley - Chelsea - £2,400,000 - July 1997
 Stephane Mahe - Rennes - £500,000 - July 1997
 Henrik Larsson - Feyenoord - £650,000 - August 1997
 Regi Blinker - Sheffield Wednesday - Exchange - August 1997
 Jonathan Gould - Bradford City - Free Transfer - August 1997
 Marc Rieper - West Ham United - £1,500,000 - ''September 1997 Paul Lambert - Borussia Dortmund - £1,900,000 - November 1997 Harald Brattbakk - Rosenborg BK - £2,000,000 - December 1997 Kevin Pilkington - Manchester United - Loan Deal''' - March 1998

Transfers Out
 Paul McStay - Retired - Out of Contract - July 1997
 Paddy Kelly - Newcastle United - Free Transfer - July 1997
 Brian O'Neil - Aberdeen - £750,000 - July 1997
 Paolo Di Canio - Sheffield Wednesday - £4,500,000 (Exchange) - August 1997

See also
 List of Celtic F.C. seasons

References

Scottish football championship-winning seasons
Celtic F.C. seasons
Celtic